"Alouette" is a popular French-language children's song, commonly thought to be about plucking the feathers from a lark. Although it is in French, it is well known among speakers of other languages; in this respect, it is similar to "Frère Jacques". Many US Marines and other Allied soldiers learnt the song while serving in France during World War I and took it home with them, passing it on to their children and grandchildren.

History
The song's origin is uncertain, but the most popular theory is that it is French-Canadian. It was first published in A Pocket Song Book for the Use of Students and Graduates of McGill College (Montreal, 1879). Canadian folklorist Marius Barbeau was of the opinion that the song's origin was France, though the first printed copy in France came 14 years after the original Canadian (McGill) publication.

The Canadian theory is based on the French fur trade that was active for over 300 years in North America. Canoes were used to transport trade goods in exchange for furs through established expansive trade routes consisting of interconnecting lakes, and rivers, and portages in the hinterland of present-day Canada and United States. The songs of the French fur trade were adapted to accompany the motion of paddles dipped in unison. Singing helped to pass the time and made the work seem lighter. In fact, it is likely that the Montreal Agents and Wintering Partners (precursor to the North West Company of fur traders) sought out and preferred to hire voyageurs who liked to sing and were good at it. They believed that singing helped the voyageurs to paddle faster and longer. French colonists ate horned larks, which they considered a game bird. "Alouette" informs the lark that the singer will pluck its head, beak, eyes, wings and tail. En roulant ma boule sings of ponds, bonnie ducks and a prince on hunting bound. Many of the songs favoured by the voyageurs have been passed down to the present era.

"Alouette" has become a symbol of French Canada for the world, an unofficial national song. Today, the song is used to teach French- and English-speaking children in Canada, and others learning French around the world, the names of body parts. Singers will point to or touch the part of their body that corresponds to the word being sung in the song.

Ethnomusicologist Conrad LaForte points out that, in song, the lark (l'alouette) is the bird of the morning, and that it is the first bird to sing in the morning, hence waking up lovers and causing them to part, and waking up others as well, something that is not always appreciated. In French songs, the lark also has the reputation of being a gossip, a know-it-all, and cannot be relied on to carry a message, as it will tell everyone; it also carries bad news. However, the nightingale, being the first bird of spring, in Europe, sings happily all the time, during the lovely seasons of spring and summer. The nightingale (i.e., rossignol) also carries messages faithfully and dispenses advice, in Latin, no less, a language that lovers understand. LaForte explains that this alludes to the Middle Ages, when only a select few still understood Latin. And so, as the lark makes lovers part or wakes up the sleepyhead, this would explain why the singer of "Alouette" wants to pluck it in so many ways if he can catch it, for, as LaForte notes, this bird is flighty as well.

The lark was eaten in Europe, and when eaten was known as a "mauviette", which is also a term for a sickly person.

Television series
The tune has been used in Season 3 of the television series Evil, possibly because the dark side of the lyrics could be seen as demonic influence/possession for the psychiatrist, a recurring character played by Kurt Fuller.

Structure
"Alouette" usually involves audience participation, with the audience echoing every line of each verse after the verse's second line. It is a cumulative song, with each verse built on top of the previous verses, much like the English carol "The Twelve Days of Christmas".

Lyrics
Below are the original French lyrics along with a literal English translation.

Adaptations
 An English song known as "If You Love Me" uses the same tune as "Alouette".
 The English composer Benjamin Britten adapted the tune for part of his 1939 orchestral composition Canadian Carnival.
 The tune of the chorus has been adapted to make the tune of the children's song "Down by the Station".
 The song was used for a paper-cutout-animated film by Norman McLaren and René Jodoin.
 The song was used by French-Canadian nuns in the United States to help teach French to their students. They substituted the French word for human body parts for the bird parts.
 An instrumental version was recorded on March 20, 1962, as one of the songs on the Pete and Conte Candoli jazz album There Is Nothing Like a Dame, featuring the Candoli  brothers on trumpets, Shelly Manne on drums, Jimmy Rowles on piano, Howard Roberts on guitar and Gary Peacock on bass.
 The tune was recomposed into a musical lesson on being a spectral ghost, titled, appropriately, Ghost Lesson and sung by Casper and others on the record Casper - A Trip Through Ghostland.
 The melody for the sung parts of "Little Bunny Foo Foo" is taken from "Alouette".
 In the film Blue Hawaii (1961), Elvis Presley is singing the song Almost Always True, based on the melody of Alouette.
 The song was interpolated into Cheryl Cole's UK number one single "Promise This" on her second album Messy Little Raindrops.
 In 2010, Saskatoon, Saskatchewan radio station CJDJ-FM made a parody called We Hate The Alouettes in commemoration of the 98th Grey Cup in Edmonton.

References

External links
The free score on traditional-songs.com

Canadian folk songs
Traditional children's songs
French-language Canadian songs
Quebec songs
1879 songs
Cumulative songs
Songs about birds
Songwriter unknown
French children's songs